Khur Ab (also Romanized as Khūr Āb; also known as Ḩūrāb, Kaura, Khorab, Khūro, Khūrrāb, and Khūru) is a village in Dehram Rural District, Dehram District, Farashband County, Fars Province, Iran. At the 2006 census, its population was 116, in 26 families.

References 

Populated places in Farashband County